Kwadwo Asare Baffuor Acheampong  known professionally as KABA, was a Ghanaian radio presenter on the Multimedia Group Limited. He was also a television host on Adom TV.

References

1980 births
2017 deaths
Ghanaian radio personalities